The Tophar Mummy (German:Die Tophar-Mumie) is a 1920 German silent film directed by Johannes Guter.

The film's art direction was by Franz Seemann.

Cast
In alphabetical order
 Ellen Bargi as Lola Renaud
 Albert Bennefeld as Pablo Don Alvares
 Emil Heyse as Dr. Morris
 Rudolf Hofbauer as Aladar Werre
 Joseph Klein as Garnier
 Friedrich Kühne as Mastaba
 Paul Mederow as Vicomte de la Roche

References

Bibliography
 Shulamith Behr, David Fanning & Douglas Jarman. Expressionism Reassessed. Manchester University Press, 1993.

External links

1920 films
Films of the Weimar Republic
Films directed by Johannes Guter
German silent feature films
Films produced by Erich Pommer
German black-and-white films